James Saunders (4 January 1932 – 28 May 1987) was a Canadian boxer. He competed in the men's heavyweight event at the 1952 Summer Olympics. At the 1952 Summer Olympics, he lost to Giacomo Di Segni of Italy.

Nicknamed, "Babyface," Saunders compiled an outstanding amateur career, winning 109 of 115 total bouts.  He represented Canada at both the 1952 Olympics and the 1954 British Empire Games.  

He was inducted into the Manitoba Sports Hall of Fame in 2019.

References

External links
 

1932 births
1987 deaths
Canadian male boxers
Olympic boxers of Canada
Boxers at the 1952 Summer Olympics
Sportspeople from Winnipeg
Heavyweight boxers